The Fifteenth Assembly of Tamil Nadu succeeded the Fourteenth Assembly of Tamil Nadu and was constituted after the victory of All India Anna Dravida Munnetra Kazhagam (AIADMK) and allies in the 2016 state assembly election held on 16 May. J. Jayalalitha assumed office as Chief Minister of Tamil Nadu for the fourth time.

Overview 
Source: Tamil Nadu Legislative Assembly website

Chief Ministers

Council of Ministers 
The council of Ministers in the Cabinet of Chief Minister Edappadi K. Palaniswamy as follows

Party positions 

The 123 AIADMK members include three independents who contested and won under the AIADMK symbol.

List of members 
Information derived from data produced by the Election Commission of India (ECI) except where noted. The results for two constituencies – Aravakurichi and Thanjavur – were undeclared at the time that the ECI published its list. Reserved constituencies for candidates from the Scheduled Castes and Scheduled Tribes (SC / ST) were defined in 2007 by the Delimitation Commission.

Important events 

On 18 September 2017, the Speaker of the Assembly disqualified 18 dissident AIADMK MLAs.

T. T. V. Dhinakaran was elected as an independent candidate from Dr. Radhakrishnan Nagar constituency in the bye-election held on 21 December 2017.

On 7 January 2019, Tamil Nadu sports minister P Balakrishna Reddy sentenced to three years in 1998 riot case, steps down.

H.Vasanthakumar elected as Member of Parliament in 2019 election,

K K Selvam Joined BJP on 6 August 2020

See also 
Government of Tamil Nadu
List of Chief Ministers of Tamil Nadu
Legislative assembly of Tamil Nadu

References 

Tamil Nadu Legislative Assembly